Agmondisham Vesey (21 January 1677 – 24 March 1739) was an Irish landowner.

Biography
He was the son of John Vesey by his second wife Anne, daughter of Colonel Agmondisham Muschamp. He was first elected to Parliament for Tuam in 1703 on the nomination of his father, the Archbishop of Tuam, and would continue to represent the seat until his death. 

He married firstly, Charlotte, daughter of William Sarsfield and Mary  Crofts, and an alleged grand-daughter of Charles II and Lucy  Walter. They had two daughters: Anne, who married Sir John Bingham, 5th Baronet, and Henrietta, who married Caesar Colclough. 

Vesey's second wife was Jane, daughter of Captain Edward Pottinger and widow of John Reynolds and of Sir Thomas Butler, 3rd Baronet. By her he had further issue, including Agmondisham, also an MP; Letitia, who married Charles Meredyth, Dean of Ardfert; and Catherine, who married Anthony Jephson. 

Vesey had residences at Molesworth Street, Dublin; Hollymount, County Mayo; Allenswood, County Kildare and Lucan, County Dublin. He died at Lucan Manor in 1739.

He was succeeded by his son Agmondisham Vesey who inherited Lucan Manor.

References

1677 births
1739 deaths
Irish MPs 1703–1713
Irish MPs 1713–1714
Irish MPs 1715–1727
Irish MPs 1727–1760
Members of the Parliament of Ireland (pre-1801) for County Galway constituencies